A Much Better Tomorrow is the debut studio album by Dan the Automator. It was released on 75 Ark in 2000. It is the expanded version of his 1996 EP, A Better Tomorrow. It features guest appearances from Kool Keith, Neph the Madman, and Poet.

Critical reception

John Bush of AllMusic gave the album 4 out of 5 stars, stating that these tracks sound "a bit aimless without at least an occasional rap in front of them." Thomas Quinlan of Exclaim! praised Dan the Automator and Kool Keith's collaborative tracks, stating that they "all demonstrate a creative partnership that is rarely found in hip-hop." He called Dan the Automator "a producer who can make beats that expose the various personalities of Kool Keith's different characters."

Track listing

Personnel
Credits adapted from liner notes.

 Kool Keith – vocals (1, 2, 3, 6, 10, 11)
 DJ Qbert – turntables (3)
 Brandon Arnovick – guitar (4)
 Neph the Madman – vocals (5)
 Sweet "P" – cartoon voices (6)
 Poet – vocals (8)
 Dan the Automator – production, mixing
 Howie Weinberg – mastering
 Christie Rixford – artwork
 Chris Veltri – photography

References

External links
 

2000 albums
Dan the Automator albums
75 Ark albums